A by-election for the seat of Lyndhurst in the Victorian Legislative Assembly was held on 27 April 2013. The by-election was triggered by the resignation of Labor Party (ALP) member Tim Holding on 18 February 2013. Martin Pakula retained the seat for Labor.

Dates
The writ for the by-election was issued on 5 March 2013. The electoral roll in Lyndhurst closed on 12 March, and the final date for candidates to nominate was 28 March. Registration of how-to-vote cards closed on 18 April. Polling day was 27 April.

Candidates
Candidates in ballot paper order for the by-election were:

The Liberal Party declined to nominate a candidate for the by-election.

How-to-vote cards

How-to-vote cards are distributed to voters at polling stations to provide information with how the candidate suggests preferences be allocated. Candidates and parties suggesting preferences are shown in each column of the table below. The Sex Party released a card with two preferences allocated, one favouring Labor and the other favouring the Greens. The Greens ran an open card at this by-election.

Results

Results are final. Pre-poll and postal votes were included on election night upon which media outlets called the by-election for Labor. The full preference distribution occurred on 1 May.

See also
 List of Victorian state by-elections

References

2013 elections in Australia
Victorian state by-elections
2010s in Victoria (Australia)
April 2013 events in Australia